Hungary for the Blues is the third live album by blues singer Chris Farlowe, released in 2006 (see 2006 in music).

This album is a recording of two performances by Farlowe. One was on June 18, 2000 at the Gastroblues Festival Paks, in Hungary, and other was on October 8, 2004 at the Charlys Musikkneipe, in Oldenburg.

Track listing 
 "I Don't Want to Sing the Blues No More" (Chris Farlowe) -4:03
 "Lonesome Road" (Roy Herrington) -6:26
 "Stormy Monday" (T-Bone Walker) -8:09
 "All or Nothing" (Steve Marriott, Ronnie Lane) -3:43
 "Tough on Me, Tough on You" (Hoy Lindsey, Lonnie Mack) -6:33
 "Shaky Ground" (Jeffrey Bowen, Al Boyd, Eddie Hazel) -6:45
 "The Guitar Don't Lie" (Tony Joe White) -7:26
 "I Think It's Gonna Rain Today" (Randy Newman) -1:47
 "Easy as That" (Rickie Byrd) -5:16
 "Out of Time" (Mick Jagger, Keith Richards) -4:39
 "Who's Been Sleeping in My Bed" (Glenn Frey) -3:40
 "Miss You Fever" (Dennis Morgan, Feargal Sharkey) -6:39
Tracks 1-12 recorded at Gastroblues Festival Paks (June 18, 2000)
 "Handbags and Gladrags" (Mike D'Abo) -6:46
 "Rock N' Roll Soldier" (Troy Seals) -7:00
Tracks 13-14 recorded at Charlys Musikkneipe (October 8, 2004)

Personnel 
Chris Farlowe - vocals
Norman Beaker - guitars, backing vocals
John Price - bass guitar, backing vocals
Andy Kingslow - keyboards, organ, piano (2004)
Dave Baldwin - keyboards, organ, piano
Paul Burgess - drums, percussion
Damian Hand - saxophones (2004)
Lenni - saxophones (2000)

References

2005 live albums
Chris Farlowe albums